Corey Deuel (born November 20, 1977 in Santa Barbara, California) is an American professional pool player from West Jefferson, Ohio. Nicknamed "Prince of Pool", he won the US Open Nine-ball Championship in 2001, and has won many other major titles. In January 2008, he was ranked the second highest US pool player by the United States Professional Poolplayers Association. He regularly represents the US in the Mosconi Cup. In 2010, he again was selected for the US team in the Mosconi Cup and was responsible for winning 2 of the US team's 8 points in the event. His tournament walk-on music is  “Disco Inferno” by The Trammps.

His reported career earnings to February 2008 were approximately $562,000. His worst professional year was 2003, in which he did not win a single major event.

"Soft breaking" and "pattern racking" are techniques that have been used by Deuel and others as a strategy to gain an advantage in tournament competitions. Pattern racking refers to purposefully racking the balls in strategic positions to take advantage of where those balls typically head. Pattern racking is illegal and unethical unless tournament rules specifically allow it. He apparently randomizes a few balls so as to skirt around the pattern racking rule, though it’s obvious what he’s doing

In 2013, he made a successful crossover to snooker by capturing the U.S. Amateur Snooker Championship title in Houston, Texas, and went on to represent the United States in the 2013 IBSF World Snooker Championship.

Early life
At the age of 14, Deuel began playing pool at Drexeline Billiards in Drexel Hill, Pennsylvania, before taking to the road in his teen years.

Snooker career
In 2013, Deuel decided to cross over to snooker. He entered in the United States National Snooker Championship and went on to win the event. His victory meant he automatically qualified as the United States entrant for the 2013 IBSF World Snooker Championship where he was eliminated in the round-robin stage after finishing 5th in his group.

In May 2014, Deuel entered into the World Snooker Q School qualification tournament in an attempt to win himself a 2-year tour card to play on the professional World Snooker Tour. He lost in the second round to the former world number 70 Daniel Wells in the first event and lost 4–2 to Martin Ball in the second event.

Deuel later competed in the 2015 Xuzhou Open in China, but was eliminated in the first round after losing 4–2 to the world number 81 Zhou Yuelong.

Deuel re-entered the World Snooker Q School qualification tournament in May 2015. Despite at one stage leading 3–1 and only needed one more frame to advance Deuel lost 4–3 Jamie Barrett in the second round of the first event.

He entered Q School in May 2018 in a bid to win himself place on the snooker professional tour and lost in the first round of the first event to Haydon Pinhey.

Pool career
Deuel has been competing professionally since 1995.

Deuel was a member of the International Pool Tour.

He was selected again for Team USA in the 2007 Mosconi Cup, after being on the team in the four previous years. He was not selected in 2008, but again represented his country during the 2009 tournament.

For 2007, he was ranked #9 in Pool & Billiard Magazine's "Fans' Top 20 Favorite Players" poll.

Personal life
Deuel lived in West Jefferson, Ohio in early 2008. He now resides in New Port Richey, Florida.

Career titles

References

1977 births
Living people
American pool players
American snooker players
People from Santa Barbara, California
People from West Jefferson, Ohio